Beaupré Cove is a cove  wide lying between Jones Point and O'Neal Point, northwest of Piccard Cove in Wilhelmina Bay, along the west coast of Graham Land. Its head is fed by Nadjakov Glacier.

The cove was first charted by the Belgian Antarctic Expedition under Gerlache, 1897–99, and named by the UK Antarctic Place-Names Committee in 1960 for Charles-François Beautemps-Beaupré, the French hydrographer who, in 1825, prepared survey instructions for the officers of the Astrolabe and the Zélée, laying down for the first time principles for making measurements from landscape drawings.

References 

Coves of Graham Land
Danco Coast